Mangalsen  is a municipality and the capital of Achham District in Sudurpashchim Province, Nepal. It was established on 18 May 2014 by merger of the former Village development committees of Janalibandali, Kuntibandali, Oligaun, Jupu, Kalagaun into its current form. At the time of the 2011 Nepal census it had a population of 32,507 people living in 6,604 individual households.

Mangalsen was a major scene of conflict between Maoist rebels and government forces during the Nepalese Civil War.

References

Neppol Megasite

Populated places in Achham District
Nepal municipalities established in 2014
Village development committees in Achham District
Municipalities in Achham District